Mohor is an Indian Bengali Romantic Drama television series that was premiered on 28 October 2019 on Star Jalsha and is also available on the digital platform Disney+ Hotstar before it's telecast. The show is produced by Magic Moments Motion Pictures of Leena Gangopadhyay and Saibal Banerjee, starring Sonamoni Saha and Pratik Sen.

Plot 
Mohor is an undergraduate student, who aspires to be a teacher. When her father forces her to get married, she runs away from her arranged marriage and comes to a big city to study. Her life changes completely after she comes across Shankha, her professor and both fall in love with each other.

Cast

Main
 Sonamoni Saha as Mohor Roy Chowdhury (née Bose) – Sameer and Basumati's younger daughter; Titir and Piklu's sister; Sankho's student turned wife
 Pratik Sen as Sankhodip Roy Chowdhury aka Sankho – Adi and Aditi's son; Subhradip, Diya and Mayuri's cousin; Mohor's professor turned husband

Recurring
 Sabitri Chatterjee as Saraswati Bose – Sameer's mother; Titir, Piklu and Mohor's grandmother
 Sumanta Mukherjee as Sameer Bose – Saraswati's son; Basumati's husband; Titir, Piklu and Mohor's father
 Rita Dutta Chakraborty as Basumati Bose – Sameer's wife; Titir, Piklu and Mohor's mother
 Lovely Maitra as Titir Bandhopadhyay (née Bose) – A Sarod specialist; Sameer and Basumati's elder daughter; Piklu and Mohor's sister; Gourab's ex-wife; Ishaan's wife
 Indrajit Chakroborty as Ishaan Bandopadhyay – A Sarod specialist; Titir's second husband
 Sujoy Saha as Pratik Bose aka Piklu – Sameer and Basumati's son; Titir and Mohor's brother
 Santu Mukherjee / Dulal Lahiri as Anantadeb Roy Chowdhury – Adi and Ayoundeb's brother; Malobika's husband; Subhra's father
 Anusuya Majumdar / Moumita Gupta as Malobika Roy Chowdhury – Anantadeb's wife; Subhra's mother
 Abhishek Chatterjee as Late Adideb Roy Chowdhury aka Adi – Anantdeb and Ayondeb's brother; Aditi's estranged husband; Sankho's father 
 Anushree Das as Dr. Aditi Roy Chowdhury – Mohor's college professor; Adi's estranged wife(later widowed); Sankho's mother
 Sourav Chakraborty as Ayondeb Roy Chowdhury – A shrewd and corrupt college director; Anantdeb and Adi's brother;  Joyeeta's husband; Diya and Mayuri's father
 Jayashree Mukherjee Kaul as Joyeeta Roy Chowdhury – Ayondeb's wife; Diya and Mayuri's mother
 Subhrajit Dutta as Subhradip Roy Chowdhury aka Subhra – Anantadeb and Malobika's son; Sankho, Diya and Mayuri's cousin; Shramana's estranged husband
 Rajanya Mitra as Shramana Roy Chowdhury – Subhra's estranged wife
 Ipshita Mukherjee / Priyanka Mitra as Diya Roy Chowdhury – Ayondeb and Joyeeta's elder daughter; Mayuri's sister; Subhra and Sankho's cousin
 Nishantika Das as Mayuri Roy Chowdhury – Ayondeb and Joyeeta's younger daughter; Diya's sister; Subhra and Sankho's cousin
 Madhurima Basak as Shrestha Dasgupta (née Ghosh)  – Sankho's former love interest and colleague; Ahir's wife
 Tathagata Mukherjee as ACP Ahir Dasgupta – A police commissioner; Mohor and Sankho's well wisher; Shrestha's husband
 Debottam Majumdar as Gourab Roy – Pramila and Mithilesh's son; Titir's first husband
 Tramila Bhattacharya / Rupa Bhattacharjee as Pramila Roy – Mithilesh's wife; Gourab's mother
 Diganta Bagchi as Mithilesh Roy – Pramila's husband; Gourab's father
 Shyamal Dutta as Shrestha's father
 Prasun Bandopadhyay as police officer
 Saswati Majumder as Saswati Ghosh – Mohor's best friend
 Bhaswar Chatterjee as Rahul Chatterjee – Shrestha's batchmate and friend; Mohor and Sankho's rival
 Debdut Ghosh as Guruji – Ishaan and Titir's music teacher
Ankita Chakraborty as Kamalini – A lawyer
 Srijani Mitra as Anulekha Mitra – Sankho's distant cousin
Sairity Banerjee as Arundhuti – A nun; Sankho's caretaker in the group of monks
 Suman Banerjee
 Ashok Bhattacharya
 Chitra Sen

Reception

Ratings

Adaptations

References

Bengali-language television programming in India
2019 Indian television series debuts
2022 Indian television series endings
Indian drama television series
Star Jalsha original programming